This is the discography of Bud Powell. Most of these recordings are listed by the year they were recorded rather than year released.

Discography
Years listed are years recorded (not years released).

Studio recordings
 1947: Bud Powell Trio (Roost)
 1949–50: Bud Powell Piano Solos (Mercury / Clef) aka (½ of) Jazz Giant (Norgran / Verve)
 1949–51: The Amazing Bud Powell (Blue Note)
 1950: Bud Powell Piano Solos No. 2 (Mercury / Clef) aka (½ of) Jazz Giant (Norgran / Verve)
 1950–51: Bud Powell's Moods (Mercury / Clef) aka The Genius of Bud Powell (Verve)
 1953: The Amazing Bud Powell, Vol. 2 (Blue Note)
 1953: Bud Powell Trio, Volume 2 (Roost)
 1954–55: Bud Powell's Moods (Norgran / Verve)
 1954–55: Jazz Original (Norgran) aka Bud Powell '57 (Norgran / Verve)
 1955: The Lonely One... (Verve)
 1955: Piano Interpretations by Bud Powell (Norgran / Verve)
 1956: Blues in the Closet (Verve)
 1956: Strictly Powell (RCA Victor)
 1957: Swingin' with Bud (RCA Victor)
 1957: Bud! The Amazing Bud Powell (Vol. 3) (Blue Note)
 1957–58: Bud Plays Bird (Roulette / Blue Note)
 1958: Time Waits: The Amazing Bud Powell (Vol. 4) (Blue Note)
 1958: The Scene Changes: The Amazing Bud Powell (Vol. 5) (Blue Note)
 1961: A Tribute to Cannonball (Columbia)
 1961: A Portrait of Thelonious (Columbia)
 1963: Bud Powell in Paris (Reprise)

Live and home recordings
 1944–48: Earl Bud Powell, Vol. 1: Early Years of a Genius, 44–48 (Mythic Sound)
 1953: Winter Broadcasts 1953 (ESP-Disk)
 1953: Spring Broadcasts 1953 (ESP-Disk)
 1953: Inner Fires (first released in 1982 on Elektra/Musician E1-60030)
 1953: Summer Broadcasts 1953 (ESP-Disk)
 1953: Autumn Broadcasts 1953 (ESP-Disk)
 1953: Live at Birdland (Queen Disc [Italy])
 1953–55: Earl Bud Powell, Vol. 2: Burnin' in U.S.A., 53–55 (Mythic Sound)
 1957–59: Earl Bud Powell, Vol. 3: Cookin' at Saint-Germain, 57–59 (Mythic Sound)
 1959–60: Bud in Paris (Xanadu)
 1959–61: Earl Bud Powell, Vol. 5: Groovin' at the Blue Note, 59–61 (Mythic Sound)
 1960: The Essen Jazz Festival Concert (Black Lion)
 1960–64: Earl Bud Powell, Vol. 11: Gift for the Friends, 60–64 (Mythic Sound)
 1961: Pianology (Moon [Italy])
 1961–64: Earl Bud Powell, Vol. 4: Relaxin' at Home, 61-64 (Mythic Sound)
 1962: Bud Powell Live in Lausanne 1962 (Stretch Archives)
 1962: Bud Powell Live in Geneva (Norma [Japan])
 1962: Bud Powell Trio at the Golden Circle, Vols. 1–5 (SteepleChase)
 1962: Budism (SteepleChase)
 1962: 1962 Copenhagen (SteepleChase)
 1962: 1962 Stockholm-Oslo (SteepleChase)
 1962: Bouncing with Bud (Sonet)
 1962: 'Round About Midnight at the Blue Note (Dreyfus Jazz)
 1962–64: Bud Powell at Home – Strictly Confidential (Fontana)
 1963: Earl Bud Powell, Vol. 6: Writin' for Duke, 63 (Mythic Sound)
 1963: Americans in Europe (multiple groups, Impulse!)
 1964: Earl Bud Powell, Vol. 7: Tribute to Thelonious, 64 (Mythic Sound)
 1964: Blues for Bouffemont aka The Invisible Cage (Fontana)
 1964: Hot House (Fontana)
 1964: Earl Bud Powell, Vol. 8: Holidays in Edenville, 64 (Mythic Sound)
 1964: The Return of Bud Powell (Roulette)
 1964: Earl Bud Powell, Vol. 9: Return to Birdland, 64 (Mythic Sound)
 1964: Earl Bud Powell, Vol. 10: Award at Birdland, 64 (Mythic Sound)
 1964: Ups'n Downs (Mainstream)

Notable compilations 
 Tempus Fugue-It (Proper) – Four disc set, from 1944 recordings with Cootie Williams to the first sessions for Blue Note and Clef in 1949–50.
 The Complete Bud Powell on Verve – Five discs, sessions from 1949 to 1956.
 The Best of Bud Powell on Verve – Single disc compilation.
 The Best of Bud Powell (Blue Note) – Single disc compilation.
 The Complete Blue Note and Roost Recordings – Four disc set containing all of the Amazing Bud Powell... Blue Note sessions plus Roost sessions from 1947 and 1953. The Blue Note sessions have also been remastered and reissued as individual CDs (though the Roost material is not included).
The Complete RCA Trio Sessions – Contains Swingin' with Bud and Strictly Powell.

As sideman
With Art Blakey
 Paris Jam Session (Fontana, 1959)
With Dexter Gordon
 Dexter Rides Again (Savoy, 1946 session only)
 Our Man in Paris (Blue Note, 1963)
With J. J. Johnson
 J. J. Johnson's Jazz Quintets (Savoy, 1946 session only
With Charles Mingus
 Mingus at Antibes – plays on "I'll Remember April" (Atlantic, 1960 [1976])
With The Quintet (Dizzy Gillespie, Charlie Parker, Charles Mingus, Max Roach)
 Jazz at Massey Hall (Debut, 1953)
With Frank Socolow
 New York Journeyman – Complete Recordings (Fresh Sound, 1945 session only)
With Sonny Stitt
 Sonny Stitt/Bud Powell/J. J. Johnson (Prestige, 1949–50 [1956])
With Cootie Williams
 Cootie Williams and His Orchestra 1941–1944 (Classics)

References 

Jazz discographies
Discographies of American artists